Todd Watson is an ice hockey coach that has been a head coach in the North American Hockey League (NAHL) and the Ontario Hockey League (OHL). 

Watson was head coach of the Detroit Compuware Ambassadors NAHL team at the Compuware Sports Arena in Plymouth, Michigan, from 2000 to 2003. He was named NAHL Coach of the Year in 2002 and Executive of the Year in 2003. He compiled a 115–37–16 record with the Ambassadors while also winning the USA Hockey Junior A National Championship in 2002. In 2003, he was hired as an assistant coach with the OHL's Plymouth Whalers, helping them win the J. Ross Robertson Cup in his final season with the club in 2006–07, and a spot in the Memorial Cup. In 2007, he was hired as head coach of the OHL's Saginaw Spirit. In the 2009 playoffs, Watson led the Spirit to their first playoff series victory, as they swept the Guelph Storm in the conference quarterfinals. He was fired early in the 2011–12 season and replaced by Greg Gilbert. After coaching the Spirit, he has also served as a scout for the NHL's Dallas Stars.

In 2019, he was named the head coach of the Odessa Jackalopes in the NAHL, but stepped down after less than one season. He continued as a regional scout for the organization.

Coaching record

References

External links
Saginaw Spirit bio

Year of birth missing (living people)
Living people
Plymouth Whalers coaches
Saginaw Spirit coaches
Sportspeople from Saginaw, Michigan